The 2017 Serbia EuroBasket team represented Serbia and won the silver medal at the EuroBasket 2017 in Helsinki (Finland), Tel Aviv (Israel), Cluj-Napoca (Romania) and Istanbul (Turkey). They were automatically qualified for the EuroBasket by taking the 4th place in EuroBasket 2015. The team was coached by Aleksandar Đorđević, with assistant coaches Miroslav Nikolić, Milan Minić and Jovica Antonić.

The EuroBasket 2017 was the 40th edition of the EuroBasket championship that is organized by FIBA Europe.

Timeline
 June 19: 25-man roster announced
 July 3: 17-man roster announcement
 July 20: Gathering of the players in Belgrade
 July 23: Start of a training camp on Kopaonik mountain
 August 6: The end of the training camp
 August 11–25: Exhibition games
 August 31 – September 17: EuroBasket 2017

Roster

25 players called up
Other than guard Stefan Marković—who had announced his retirement from international basketball after the 2016 Olympics at the age of 28—each player from the 2016 Rio de Janeiro Olympics silver-winning team was also included on the 25-man preliminary roster for EuroBasket 2017. The upcoming EuroBasket would thus mark the first time that the Serbian national team is without Stefan Marković at a major tournament since Serbia went independent in 2006. 

Minnesota Timberwolves power forward Nemanja Bjelica was included on the 25-man roster, despite a left foot injury he had sustained in March 2017, which made him unavailable to join the team. Denver Nuggets center Nikola Jokić announced on July 3 that he would not be showing up at the training camp, citing his desire to prepare for the following NBA season. In addition to Bjelica and Jokić who were unavailable due to injury or personal reasons, six more players were cut by head coach Đorđević: Nikola Milutinov, Nemanja Dangubić, Ognjen Jaramaz, Ognjen Dobrić, Aleksa Radanov, and Dejan Davidovac.

17 players at the training camp
On July 29, with the 17-player training camp already under way for some ten days, the first one to drop out was  Marko Simonović due to injuring his right thumb. 

On August 17, head coach Aleksandar Đorđević announced that center Miroslav Raduljica would not be able to play at the championship, due to a knee injury. 

Three days later, on August 20, head coach Đorđević announced that team captain Miloš Teodosić would also be unable to continue, due to a chronic thigh injury. Power forward Milan Mačvan was selected as a new team captain due to Teodosić's inability to play at the EuroBasket. 

On August 29, it was announced that Nemanja Nedović and Nikola Kalinić wouldn't be able to participate at the championships, due to injuries.

Final 12-man roster
The members of Serbia roster at the 2016 Summer Olympics guards Bogdan Bogdanović, Stefan Jović, forwards Stefan Birčević, Milan Mačvan and center Vladimir Štimac are coming back to EuroBasket roster, while guards forwards Branko Lazić, Marko Gudurić and Vladimir Lučić make senior men's debut with the Serbian national team, at a major international tournament. Center Boban Marjanović makes the first appearance at a major tournament since the EuroBasket 2011 while guard Vasilije Micić previously played at the EuroBasket 2013. Guard Dragan Milosavljević and center Ognjen Kuzmić made their debuts at the EuroBasket 2015.

The following were candidates to make the team:

Notes

Depth chart

Staff 

Source: KSS

Exhibition games
The Serbia roster has begun its exhibition schedule against Serbian University team on August 2, 2017. They had participated at the 2017 Belgrade Trophy (August 11–13) together with Greece and Montenegro, then at the Supercup in Hamburg, Germany (August 17–20) with Germany, Poland and Russia. Last games were at the 2017 Acropolis of Athens Tournament where they played together with Greece, Italy and Georgia from August 23–25.

Serbia played nine exhibition games. Had just one lost. The Serbia roster won the Belgrade Trophy and the Hamburg Supercup and came the second at the Acropolis of Athens.

Kraljevo game

Belgrade Trophy

Supercup Hamburg

Acropolis of Athens

Tournament

Preliminary round 

All times are local (UTC+3)

Latvia

Russia

Turkey

Great Britain

Belgium

Knockout stage

Round of 16 
Serbia made the early running before Hungary fought back nearing half-time and the second-half was a near mirror image. Hungary got within 7 points early in the fourth but Serbia steadied, with their dominance on the inside too much for Hungary to handle. Hungary made a comeback bid in the last quarter getting the margin to within 7 points with 8 minutes left after hitting consecutive threes. However, a pretty penetration and dish by Stefan Jović to Milan Mačvan steadied things for Serbia before Boban Marjanović scored four quick points to snuff out Hungary's challenge. Ognjen Kuzmić was a handful for Hungary all game and finished with 17 points and 10 rebounds in a commanding performance. Serbia's size was too much for Hungary and that showed on the glass with their 37-23 domination in rebounds.

Quarterfinals 
Serbia outscored Italy 26-16 in a dominant second quarter to take command of the contest. Italy appeared set to stage a comeback midway through the fourth, getting within 8 points, but Bogdan Bogdanović hit a three and scored another bucket on the next possession to steady Serbia. Serbia took full advantage of their size advantage by dominating on the boards to convincingly win the rebounds 44-19. Bogdanović struggled in the opening three quarters scoring just 8 points, including 0-of-7 from three. However, he came alive in the fourth to ensure Serbia would not have any nervous moments.

Semifinals 
It was a game of spurts with momentum swinging wildly within minutes. Russia trailed for much of the game by double digits before getting within 2 points midway through the fourth. Aleksey Shved missed a wide open deep three for the lead, only for Vasilije Micić to connect from deep at the other end. It gave the momentum to Serbia and they hung on from there. With the towering Boban Marjanović, Serbia absolutely dominated in the paint, despite Russia having no shortage of size themselves. Serbia won the battle down-low, outscoring Russia 44-22 in the paint. Serbia led for most of the game through a 14-0 run in the second quarter. However, the game took several turns as Russia would not give up. With Shved scoring in spurts, Russia fought right back getting it to a single possession game until Serbia steadied late.

Final

Awards 
All-Tournament Team
 Bogdan Bogdanović

Statistics

Statistical leaders

Individual game highs

Team game highs

References

External links
Official website
EuroBasket 2017 profile

Serbia men's national basketball team by year
EuroBasket 2017
2017–18 in Serbian basketball